Adnams is a regional brewery founded in 1872 in Southwold, Suffolk, England, by George and Ernest Adnams. It produces cask ale and bottled beers. Annual production is around 85,000 barrels.

In 2010, the company established the Copper House distillery for the production of gin, vodka and whisky.

History

The earliest recorded brewing on the Adnams site was in 1396 by Johanna de Corby.

The Sole Bay Brewery in Southwold was purchased in 1872 by George and Ernest Adnams. The company was incorporated in 1890, and has remained independent since then, producing a range of beers for distribution mainly in East Anglia.  The Adnams family was joined in 1902 by Pierse Loftus, who brought strategic vision, technical expertise and sound financial principles, building the base on which succeeding generations have been able to build. Adnams is now a PLC, with numerous shareholders, but still has family representation on the board, with Jonathan Adnams as chairman.

The yeast used by Adnams was sourced from Morgans brewery of Norwich in 1942.

Until 1953 and from 1970 to 2006, casks of Adnams ale were delivered to the six pubs of Southwold by horse and dray; the tradition ended when a new distribution depot was built three miles from the brewery.

The company founded a charity, The Adnams Charity, in 1990 to celebrate its centenary as a public company. A percentage of the company's annual profits is used to support worthwhile causes within a 25-mile radius of Southwold.

In 1993, Adnams Extra won the Champion Beer of Britain, an award presented by the Campaign for Real Ale at the annual Great British Beer Festival.  Adnams remains committed to brewing cask ale and operating non-themed pubs.  Cask ale is available in all its 70 pubs, and it supplies more than 1000 other outlets direct.  New fermenting vessels were installed in March 2001 to cope with demand, and the brewhouse was completely re-equipped in July 2006, making it one of the most energy efficient in Europe.

At the beginning of 2004, Adnams purchased land in neighbouring village of Reydon to expand its business with a new distribution centre, designed by architect Jeremy Blake, which was nominated for the 2007 RICS East of England Award for Sustainability. Adnams was awarded a Queen's Award for Enterprise in the sustainable development category in 2005.

The distribution centre features the UK's largest living roof known as the Sky Garden which is made up of a variety of sedum species. Not only does this help to insulate the building, but the water stored in the sedum plants is also harvested and used to flush the staff toilets and clean company vehicles. This, combined with the solar panels and the environmental construction have meant the energy bills have been cut by half.

In June 2009, Adnams signed a five-year agreement to supply Ipswich Town FC with beers at their Portman Road stadium, replacing the 14-year-old association with Greene King.

In 2010 Carl's Copper Pot still and Rectifying columns were installed and put in operation in November of that same year for the production of Gin, Vodka & Whisky.

In early 2019, Adnams launched a new English cider called Wild Wave.

Beers
Adnams produce regular cask ale, seasonal beer, bottled beer, "international" beer and "commemorative" beers and cider :

Regular beers

Broadside, a 4.7% abv premium bitter
Explorer, a 4.3% golden bitter that was introduced in 2004 as a summer seasonal; it became a regular beer in February 2006
Ghost Ship, a 4.5% abv pale ale, previously available May through to October but available year-round from March 2012 and is very flavoursome according to Neil Sharman.
Ghost Ship Alcohol Free, a 0.5% version of their Ghost Ship pale ale. Produced through reverse osmosis.
Sole Star, a low alcohol (2.7% abv) amber ale, introduced December 2011 and delisted shortly afterwards, it remains available in bottles. Reintroduced in 2017 at 0.9% abv and claimed to have the same taste as the original.
Southwold Bitter, a 3.7% abv session bitter. This was renamed from plain "Bitter" and the packaging redesigned in May 2011.
Topaz Gold, a 4.0% abv pale golden ale, brewed with Australian hop varieties, introduced August 2012

Keg beers
Spindrift, a 5.0% abv golden bitter introduced in 2006

Seasonal
English Red Ale, a 4.5% abv ale, available November to December, brewed with English Admiral hops.
Extra, 4.3% abv. Available in April. Winner of the Champion Beer of Britain award in 1993.
Fat Sprat, a 3.8% abv Amber summer beer, brewed with Pale Ale malted barley, Munich, Cara and Black malt, with Columbus, English Goldings, Cascade and Chinook hops; introduced in May 2013.
Kristal White Ale, a 4.2% abv golden wheat beer, available February to Easter, brewed with malted wheat, barley and German Noble Hops.
May Day, a 5.0% abv golden ale, available April and May, is made with East Anglian Pale Ale malt, and hopped with First Gold
Mild, 3.2% abv. Available in March and May.
Old Ale, a 4.1% "cold weather beer", introduced October 2006, and available October to January
Oyster Stout, a 4.3% abv winter stout, available February and March, is made from East Anglian Pale Ale Malt, Crystal Malt, Chocolate Malt, roasted Barley and English Golding hops
Regatta, a 4.3% abv golden ale for summer, is available May through to August
Tally Ho, a 7.0% barley wine, limited availability in December
Yuletide, a 4.5% abv Christmas beer, available from November to December, is brewed with Maris Otter, Chocolate and Amber Malts and Boadicea & Chinook Hops
Jester, a 4.8% abv single hop golden beer brewed with Pale Ale Malt and hopped with a new British hop called Jester.

Bottles
Broadside, a 6.3% bottled strong ale
Ease Up I.P.A, a 4.6% session beer 
East Green, a 4.3%, a carbon neutral beer with a lighter bottle made with 15% recycled glass
Explorer, a 5.5% bottled ale which, like the cask Explorer, is a blend of English and American styles
Gun Hill, a 4.0% bottled dark mild
Lighthouse, a 3.4% bottled traditional pale ale named after Southwold lighthouse; recipe based on an award-winning beer that used to be brewed called 'Champion Pale Ale'
Spindrift, a 5.0% abv golden bitter, in bottles from 2010.
Tally Ho, a bottled version of the barley wine which, at 7.2%, is slightly stronger than its cask equivalent
The Bitter (formerly Suffolk Strong Ale) 4.5% bottled version of the retired cask Extra

International beers
From time to time, Adnams produce limited brews of specialty beers, either in the styles of non-UK beers, or using special international ingredients. These beers are usually available only from selected outlets. Past and current international beers have included:
American Style IPA, a 4.8% abv cask beer using Californian yeast and American hop varieties
Belgian Style Abbey Ale, a 5.0% abv cask beer
Dutch Style Bokbier, a 5.3% abv cask beer
New Zealand Pale Ale, a 4.0% abv cask beer brewed using Nelson Sauvin hops from New Zealand
Spiced Winter Beer, a 4.0% abv cask beer incorporating cinnamon, juniper and other spices

Commemorative beers
Adnams have a long history of producing limited and one-off special beers to commemorate events of local or national importance. These are generally available for a limited period in bottles, and in cask at a few selected outlets. Recent beers include:-

Diamond Ale, a 4.1% abv beer, brewed with Pale Ale and Premium Cara malts, with Sovereign hops and locally sourced honey, produced to celebrate the 2012 Diamond Jubilee of HM Queen Elizabeth II
Flame Runner, a 3.9% abv beer with spices and citrus, to celebrate the 2012 London Olympics and the Olympic Torch Relay through Southwold
Royal Wedding Ale, a 4.1% abv ale with Heather Honey, brewed for the wedding in 2011 of HRH Prince William and Catherine Middleton

Distillery
The company branched out to distilling when they installed an 800-litre copper pot still with 42 plated rectifying columns, they acquired from Carl in 2010.
The capacity was expanded in 2015 with two extra pot stills.

The product line holds a wide variety of gin, vodka and whisky. For their whisky range different mash-bills (100% malted barley; 75% rye, 25% barley; 100% rye, 60% malted wheat, 10% malted oats, 30% malted barley) are used.

Some less common products of the distiller are, a Bierbrand Spirit of Broadside, two Absinth expressions: Verte & Rouge  but also non grain products like brandy is made from locally grown apples, or grapes.

References

External links

Official website
Brewery tours from the official website
Description of the environmentally friendly distribution center from Hoare Lea
Adnams Cellar and Kitchen stores

Companies based in Suffolk
Food and drink companies established in 1872
Gins
Vodkas
Distilleries in England
Breweries in England
British companies established in 1872
1872 establishments in England
Southwold